Aradus is a genus of true bugs in the family Aradidae, the flat bugs. It is distributed worldwide, mainly in the Holarctic. There are around 200 or more species in the genus.

Most Aradus feed on fungi, often in dead trees. Some species are pyrophilous, associating with burned habitat such as forests after wildfires. They feed on the particular fungi that grow on burnt wood. Examples include A. laeviusculus, which eats fungi growing on burned conifers, and Aradus gracilis, which occurs in large numbers on burned South Florida slash pine (Pinus elliottii var. densa).

Species include:

Aradus abbas
Aradus acutus
Aradus aequalis
Aradus alaskanus   
Aradus ampliatus  
Aradus antennalis   
Aradus apicalis
Aradus approximatus    
Aradus arizonicus  
Aradus barberi
Aradus basalis
Aradus behrensi
Aradus betulae
Aradus blaisdelli    
Aradus borealis  
Aradus breviatus   
Aradus brevicornis   
Aradus brunnicornis   
Aradus carolinensis    
Aradus cincticornis    
Aradus coarctatus   
Aradus coloradensis    
Aradus compressus    
Aradus concinnus    
Aradus consors    
Aradus crenatus
Aradus curticollis 
Aradus debilis
Aradus depictus    
Aradus duzeei   
Aradus evermanni    
Aradus falleni
Aradus froeschneri    
Aradus funestus
Aradus furnissi   
Aradus furvus
Aradus fuscipennis 
Aradus fuscomaculatus    
Aradus gracilicornis    
Aradus gracilis   
Aradus hesperius    
Aradus implanus    
Aradus inornatus  
Aradus insignitus    
Aradus insolitus    
Aradus intectus    
Aradus intermedius    
Aradus kormilevi
Aradus lawrencei    
Aradus leachi
Aradus linsleyi
Aradus lugubris   
Aradus marginatus 
Aradus medioximus    
Aradus montanus
Aradus occidentalis
Aradus opertaneus   
Aradus orbiculus  
Aradus oregonicus    
Aradus ornatus
Aradus ovatus    
Aradus oviventris 
Aradus paganicus
Aradus pannosus   
Aradus parshleyi  
Aradus parvicornis
Aradus patibulus
Aradus persimilis   
Aradus proboscideus 
Aradus quadrilineatus
Aradus robustus
Aradus saileri    
Aradus saskatchewanensis  
Aradus serratus
Aradus shermani  
Aradus signaticornis    
Aradus similis
Aradus snowi
Aradus subruficeps  
Aradus taylori   
Aradus tuberculifer  
Aradus uniannulatus   
Aradus uniformis    
Aradus vadosus 
Aradus vandykei

References

External links
Aradus subgenus Aradus and Aradus subgenus Quilnus. Integrated Taxonomic Information System (ITIS).

Aradidae
Pentatomomorpha genera